The 2019–20 Exeter City season was the club's 118th year in existence and their eighth consecutive season in League Two. The club reached the semi-finals of the EFL Trophy. City were eliminated in the second round of the FA Cup, and in the first round of the EFL Cup.

The season covers the period from 1 July 2019 to 30 June 2020.

Background and pre-season

The 2018–19 was Matt Taylor's first season as Exeter City manager, having taken over from Paul Tisdale in the summer of 2018. Exeter finished the season in 9th place, one point outside the play-offs, and were knocked out of all domestic cups in the early stages.

The Grecians''' prospects for the season were further hit by the departures of Christy Pym and Hiram Boateng on free transfers to Peterborough United and MK Dons respectively. Goalkeepers James Hamon and Felix Norman; defenders Troy Brown, Luke Croll and Jimmy Oates; and midfielder Max Smallcombe  also departed following the expiration of their contracts. Goalkeeping coach Chris Weale, who had also been named on the subs bench during the previous season, also left the club, as did assistant manager Eric Kinder, strength and conditioning coach Andrew Wiseman, physiotherapist Adey Saunderson and sports rehabilitator Jess Preece. Former Exeter City midfielder Wayne Carlisle was promoted to the role of assistant manager, Steve Hale was brought in as goalkeeping coach, Connor Durbridge became the club's new strength and conditioning coach, and Gareth Law and Dan Feasey joined as club physiotherapists.

Nine new players arrived at St James Park during July, eight on a permanent basis and one on loan. The loan arrival was Robbie Cundy, who had spent the previous season on loan at Bath City, joining from EFL Championship side Bristol City until the end of the season. Nigel Atangana and Tom Parkes signed from fellow EFL League Two sides Cheltenham Town and Carlisle United on free transfers, while goalkeepers Lewis Ward and Jonny Maxted, and striker Nicky Ajose dropped down from higher divisions. Veteran defender Gary Warren signed on a free transfer from Yeovil Town, as did journeyman striker Alex Fisher. Noah Smerdon signed from Gloucester City, and soon after was loaned out (alongside young centre-back Jordan Dyer) to Tiverton Town until January 2020.

A further four City youngsters departed St James Park on loan to clubs in the south-west of England before the start of the season. Theo Simpson joined Barnstaple Town on loan, initially until August; Joel Randall and Will Dean joined the recently relegated Weston-super-Mare and Truro City until January; and Alex Hartridge signed a six-month loan deal with National League South side Bath City.

A new fluorescent yellow and purple away kit, replacing a fluorescent yellow kit that had been worn the previous three seasons, was unveiled on 3 July 2019. The Grecians unveiled a new black and red third kit during the early stages of the season. Both kits were supplied by Joma and sponsored by Flybe.

The club announced their pre-season schedule on 16 June 2019.

Review
August

A late Ryan Bowman goal sealed an opening day victory for Exeter against Sol Campbell's Macclesfield Town at St James Park, in a game watched by 4,502. City made it two on the spin against Stevenage Town, again courtesy of a late goal, this time through Nicky Law. In good form, an away EFL Cup tie against Coventry City F.C. beckoned. City however failed to carry over their league form, with a young side (featuring Ben Chrisene, who aged 15 years, 7 months and 1 day, became the club's youngest ever player to make a senior appearance) being defeated 4–1, with Sweeney scoring a consolation goal.

Exeter were on the wrong end of a late equalising goal in their third league game of the season, against Swindon Town, though they moved up to second in the table (behind Swindon) despite dropping points. They were further frustrated against Oldham Athletic, failing to win despite creating good chances against the Latics. Another late goal, again scored by Nicky Law, helped Exeter return to winning ways in a 2–3 win over Morecambe, moving them to the top of the table – one point above fierce rivals Plymouth Argyle.  Ryan Bowman's early goal against Mansfield Town was enough to secure victory, and ensure that City finished the month unbeaten in the league. Manager Matt Taylor subsequently won the EFL League Two August Manager of the Month award.

There was relatively little transfer activity in the second half of the summer transfer window for Exeter, with Matt Taylor in advance ruling out any late moves in the transfer market. Jayden Richardson joined from Nottingham Forest on a season-long loan on 16 September, while young midfielder Harry Kite embarked on a loan move of his own, to Taunton Town, that same day. Barbadian striker Jonathan Forte, who had signed for Exeter the previous summer, was forced to retire aged 33 due to a 'severe' knee injury during sustained the previous season.

Transfers
Transfers in

Transfers out

Loans in

Loans out

Fixtures
League Two

On Thursday, 20 June 2019, the EFL League Two fixtures were revealed.

League table

Play-offs

FA Cup

The first round draw was made on 21 October 2019.

EFL Cup

The first round draw was made on 20 June.

EFL Trophy

On 9 July 2019, the pre-determined group stage draw was announced with Invited clubs to be drawn on 12 July 2019.

Table (group stage)

Statistics

|-
!colspan=14|Players who left during the season:''

|}

Goals record

Disciplinary record

References

Exeter City
Exeter City F.C. seasons